Winton is a village and civil parish in the Eden District of Cumbria, England. At the 2011 census Winton was grouped with Kaber giving a total population of 327. The word Winton is Old English or Anglo-Saxon in origin, Wyntuna meaning a pasture. Farmstead was first identified in 1094, shortly after the Norman Conquest, during a period known as the 'Harrying of the North'.
  On 12 April 1659, the village of Winton was at the centre of the Westmorland witch trials, during which several women were hanged at Appleby General Sessions, found guilty of bewitching Margaret Bousefield.

During the Middle Ages Winton was at the centre of the sheep rearing in the Eden Valley, where the flocks moved across the hills into pastures new.  More controversial was the part played by the Archbishop of York in dealing with invasions by Scots armies, raiding, looting and burning, sheep-stealing.  On 5 October 1357 the local bishop was required to accept the redemption of King David Bruce of Scotland, for the Suffragan Michael of York held sway in the mountains of the West March.

Both Kirkby Stephen and the village of Winton had a grammar school each, where its major benefactor was a Cambridge educated teacher.  Richard Burn helped found the free school that took all children from the neighbouring parishes.

Notable people
 John Langhorne (poet)
 Richard Burn, school benefactor

See also

Listed buildings in Winton, Cumbria
List of English and Welsh endowed schools (19th century)

References

External links 

 Cumbria County History Trust: Winton (nb: provisional research only – see Talk page)
Winton in The Cumbria Directory

Villages in Cumbria
Civil parishes in Cumbria